Roubbens Joseph (born December 21, 1994) is an American professional gridiron football offensive lineman for the San Antonio Brahmas of the XFL. He played college football at the University at Buffalo.

Professional career

National Football League
Following the end of his college football career, Joseph was signed as a free agent by the Baltimore Ravens, Miami Dolphins, and Washington Redskins of the National Football League.

Canadian Football League
Joseph signed with the Toronto Argonauts of the Canadian Football League (CFL) in 2019, playing in 3 games. He made his CFL debut in the starting lineup on July 25, 2019, against the Edmonton Eskimos.

On February 1, 2021, Joseph was released by the Argonauts.

Indoor Football League
On December 17, 2021, Joseph signed with the Massachusetts Pirates of the Indoor Football League (IFL).

San Antonio Brahmas
On November 17, 2022, Joseph was drafted in the 6th round of the 2023 XFL Draft by the San Antonio Brahmas.

References

External links
 
CFL profile
Toronto Argonauts bio
Buffalo Bulls bio

Living people
1994 births
Baltimore Ravens players
Buffalo Bulls football players
Hudson Valley Vikings football players
Massachusetts Pirates players
Miami Dolphins players
Players of American football from Massachusetts
San Antonio Brahmas players
Sportspeople from Springfield, Massachusetts
Toronto Argonauts players
Washington Redskins players